Newcomer is a surname. Notable people with the surname include:

 Benjamin Franklin Newcomer (1827–1901), American railroad executive and bank president
 Carrie Newcomer, American singer and songwriter
 Christian Newcomer (1749–1830), American farmer and preacher
 Clarence Charles Newcomer (1923 – 2005), US District Judge of the United States District Court for the Eastern District of Pennsylvania 
 Francis K. Newcomer (1889–1967), Governor of the Panama Canal Zone
 John Newcomer, American game developer, creator of Joust
 John Newcomer (Maryland politician) (1797–1861), American politician and farmer
 John Darlington Newcomer (1867–1931), American architect
 Scott Newcomer, American politician